Last Words is a 1968 short film by Werner Herzog shot in Crete and on the island of Spinalonga. The film was shot in two days during the filming of Herzog's feature Signs of Life, and edited in one day.

The film tells a story of the last man to leave the abandoned island of Spinalonga, which had been used as a leper colony. The man refused to leave, and so was forcibly removed. He now lives in Crete, where he plays the Cretan lyra at nights in a bar, and refuses to speak. The film's narrative style is very unconventional, with most characters speaking their lines several times repeatedly in long takes. The man from the island has the most spoken lines of any character, as he repeatedly explains that he refuses to speak, even a single word.

Cast (uncredited)
 Antonis Papadakis : the last leper
 Lefteris Daskalakis : the bouzouki player

References

External links 
 

1968 films
West German films
German short films
German avant-garde and experimental films
1960s German-language films
1960s German films